Irina Veretennicoff is a physicist, honorary professor of the Vrije Universiteit Brussel.

Career 
Veretennicoff graduated in Physics from the Vrije Universiteit Brussel (VUB) in 1973 with a doctorate under the guidance of Radu Balescu of Université libre de Bruxelles (ULB).

Irina Veretennicoff has been an honorary member of the Class of Natural Sciences Royal Flemish Academy of Belgium for Science and the Arts since 1998.

References

1944 births
Living people
Belgian physicists
Vrije Universiteit Brussel alumni
Members of the Royal Flemish Academy of Belgium for Science and the Arts